Tandar Aghaj (also Romanized as Tandar Āghāj; also known as Tanūr Āghāj) is a village in Ujan-e Gharbi Rural District, in the Central District of Bostanabad County, East Azerbaijan Province, Iran. At the 2006 census, its population was 174, in 29 families.

References 

Populated places in Bostanabad County